Horriyeh (also Romanized as Ḩorrīyeh; also known as Ḩorrīyeh-ye Yek) is a village in Elhayi Rural District, in the Central District of Ahvaz County, Khuzestan Province, Iran. At the 2006 census, its population was 308, in 50 families.

References 

Populated places in Ahvaz County